The Botswana women's national cricket team represents the country of Botswana in women's cricket matches. The team is currently coached by Karabo Motlhanka.

In April 2018, the International Cricket Council (ICC) granted full Women's Twenty20 International (WT20I) status to all its members. Therefore, all Twenty20 matches played between Botswana women and another international side since 1 July 2018 have been full WT20Is.

Botswana's first WT20I matches were contested as part of the Botswana 7s tournament in August 2018 against Lesotho, Malawi, Mozambique, Namibia, Sierra Leone and Zambia (Zambia's matches were not classified as WT20Is as they had a Botswanan player in their squad). Botswana finished third on the table with three wins and two losses and won the third place play off against Mozambique by a margin of nine wickets.

In December 2020, the ICC announced the qualification pathway for the 2023 ICC Women's T20 World Cup. The Botswana women's team are scheduled to make their debut at an ICC women's event when they play in the 2021 ICC Women's T20 World Cup Africa Qualifier group.

Squad

This lists all the players who played for Botswana in the past 12 months or were named in the most recent squad. Updated on 17 Jun 2022.

Records and statistics
International Match Summary — Botswana Women
 
Last updated 17 June 2022

Twenty20 International 

 Highest team total: 224/2 v Eswatini, 9 September 2021, at Botswana Cricket Association Oval, Gaborone.
 Highest individual score: 77, Olebogeng Batisani v Eswatini, 9 September 2021, at Botswana Cricket Association Oval, Gaborone.
 Best individual bowling figures: 6/8, Botsogo Mpedi v Lesotho, 20 August 2018, at Botswana Cricket Association Oval, Gaborone.

Most T20I runs for Botswana Women

Most T20I wickets for Botswana Women

T20I record versus other nations

Records complete to WT20I #1125. Last updated 17 June 2022.

See also
 Botswana national cricket team
 List of Botswana women Twenty20 International cricketers

References

External links
 

Women's
Women's national cricket teams
Cricket